Saban's Adventures of Oliver Twist (lit. "The New Adventures of Oliver Twist", also known as Oliver Twist) is an animated series created by Saban Entertainment. The series first aired in the United States from 1 February 1996 to 12 February 1997 through Saban's syndicated "Saban Kids Network" strand, totaling 52 episodes. The series began airing in France on TF1 on September 1, 1997.

Ownership of the series passed to Disney in 2001 when Disney acquired Fox Kids Worldwide, which also includes Saban Entertainment. The series is not available on Disney+.

Loosely based on the 1838 novel Oliver Twist by Charles Dickens, the series features anthropomorphic animals and occasionally humans.

Characters
Oliver Twist (voiced by Mona Marshall) - a dog. An orphan on the run from the workhouse, trying to earn the respect of his friends Dodger and Charlie and hoping to find his mother, whom he got separated from.
Artful Dodger (voiced by Brianne Siddall) - a rabbit. A cunning sort who is full of ideas.
Charlie Bates (voiced by Tony Pope) - a pig. A laid-back sort who is pretty accident prone and greedy for food.
Nancy (voiced by Mona Marshall) - a cat. A courteous and kind sort, who dreams of becoming an actress and stays with Fagin's fellowship.
Princess Annushka (voiced by Barbara Goodson) - a dog. She is a runaway Russian princess who gives little regard for the boys and stays with Fagin's fellowship.
Fagin (voiced by Bob MacGarva) - a red fox. Leader of the fellowship of young thieves.
Mr. Bumble - a wolf. The master of the workhouse. Frequently sends out his two cat goons, Scratch and Sniff to try to capture Oliver and if possible, his two friends as well.
Bill Sikes - a brown bear. A brutish ruffian of a man who makes threats by extortion and intimidation to gain his money. He is sometimes accompanied by a gang of thieving river rats with Big Cheese as his second-in-command.

Plot
Oliver escapes the orphan house and is on the run. While on the run he meets Dodger and together they go to Fagin. Fagin is the boss of a little gang and Oliver must prove himself, if he is worthy to stay; the orphan lord will stop at nothing to bring Oliver back.

Oliver and his friends, Dodger and Charlie, are making it a mission to find Oliver's mother and they make adventures along the way.

Episodes

References

1990s American animated television series
1996 American television series debuts
American children's animated adventure television series
Animated television series about dogs
Animated television series about orphans
English-language television shows
First-run syndicated television programs in the United States
Television series by Saban Entertainment
Television shows based on Oliver Twist